The January 1999 Likud leadership election was held on 25 January 1999 to elect the leader of the Likud party. Incumbent party leader and prime minister Benjamin Netanyahu handily defended a challenge by former minister of defense Moshe Arens.

The election coincided with the primary to select the party's electoral list for the 1999 Israeli general election.

Candidates

Running
Moshe Arens, former member of the Knesset (1973–1992); former minister of defense (1984–1988 and 1990–1992), former minister of foreign affairs (1988–1990); former minister without portfolio (1988–1990)
Benjamin Netanyahu, prime minister since 1996, Likud party leader since 1993, member of the Knesset since 1988

Withdrew
Uzi Landau, member of the Knesset since 1984

Background
The vote took part ahead of the 1999 Israeli general election, held after Netanyahu's governing coalition collapsed. There had been several defections from the party leading up to the leadership race, including Benny Begin and Dan Meridor, who both defected to lead their own parties in the 1999 general election.

Moshe Arens was a veteran of the Likud party that had formerly been a mentor to Netanyahu and had fully supported Netanyahu's candidacy in the 1993 Likud leadership election. However, Arens had broken away from Netanyahu after Netanyahu became prime minister in 1996. Arens, and several other veterans of Likud, began to distrust Netanyahu after he became prime minister, disapproving of many of the choices Netanyahu had made for political appointees. Arens ended six years of political retirement to challenge Netanyahu for the leadership of Likud. He declared that he was the only one that could, "stop the internal hemorrhaging in the Likud." Political analysts saw Arens' chances of unseating Netanyahu as being unlikely.

Electorate
The leadership election was open to the party's general membership, which, at the time, numbered at 168,127.

Result

References

Likud leadership 1
1999 01
Likud01
Likud leadership election
1999 Likud leadership election